The Chief of Staff to the Prime Minister of Australia is the principal adviser and head of the Prime Minister's Office. The position of Chief of Staff to the Prime Minister of Australia was formally created by Prime Minister Gough Whitlam in 1972 to run the political and private office of the Prime Minister.

Powers and responsibilities 
The Chief of Staff is directly responsible to the Prime Minister for the management of the Prime Minister's Office and for the coordination of strategic and policy priorities.

List of Chiefs of Staff

See also
 Prime Minister of Australia
 Prime Minister's Office
 Downing Street Chief of Staff
 White House Chief of Staff 
 Chief of Staff to the Prime Minister (Canada)

References

Further reading

External links

 Official website of the Prime Minister of Australia

 
Politics of Australia